Lebanon competed at the 2022 World Athletics Championships in Eugene, Oregon from 15 to 24 July 2022. Lebanon had entered 1 athlete.

Results

Men 
Track and road events

References

Lebanone
World Championships in Athletics
2022